Wachowicz is a Polish surname. Notable people with the surname include:

 Marcin Wachowicz (born 1981), Polish footballer
 Włodzimierz Wachowicz (born 1946), Polish handball player
 Zbigniew Wachowicz (born 1972), Polish footballer

See also
 Wachowski

Polish-language surnames